Marginal EP is the third album of the Belgian rock band Dead Man Ray. It was released in 2001. It is a compilation of random outtakes, bizarre cutups and b-sides of previous recording sessions.

Titles
Smallband
Ersatz
Emotional tourism
Skuf
Cerchy
Kruger
Killywatch
Finar
Blind surfer
Sofa
Munchen
Pertube
Stab
Cyprus
Theque K7
Kind + Gezin
Arab
Beer
Switch 99
Sundrama
Noisette
Modril
End

Dead Man Ray albums
2001 albums